French Guianan cuisine or Guianan cuisine is a mixture of Creole, Bushinengue, and indigenous cuisines, supplemented by influences from the cuisines of more recent immigrant groups. Common ingredients include cassava, smoked fish, and smoked chicken. Creole restaurants may be found alongside Chinese restaurants in major cities such as Cayenne, Kourou and Saint-Laurent-du-Maroni.

Ingredients

Spices and condiments
Bélimbi
 Allspice
 Cinnamon
 Clove
 Turmeric
 Ginger
 Kwabio (condiment)
 Cayenne pepper
 Green pepper
 Roucou

Vegetables 

 Garlic
 Onion
 Shallots
 Eggplant
 Yellow and green banana (cooking banana)
 Calou (pepper)
 Zucchini
 Chestnut
 Pumpkin
 Cucumber
 Dachine
 Spinach
 Breadfruit
 Yardlong bean
 Red bean
 Yams
 Cassava
 Turnip
 parépou
 Sorossi
 Yam
 Pigeon peas
 Pea
 Tayove
 Green bean

Common fruits 

 Apricot country
 Acerola cherry
 Cayenne cherry
 Mango
 Passion fruit
 Orange
 Clementine
 Mandarin
 Chadeck
  Lemon
 Papaya
 Apple Cinnamon
 Kythira plum
 Rambutan
 Tomato
 Banana

Meats 

 Beef
 Chicken
 Duck
 Goose
 Mutton
 Pig
 Turkey
 Veal

Game (hunting) 
 Agami
 Peccary
 Agouti
 Maïpouri
 Hocco
 Iguana
 Cingulata
 Maraï

Seafood 

 Sardines
 Tuna
 Machoiran
 Acoupa
 Snapper
 Mangrove crab
 Mangrove oyster
 Shrimp
 Atipas
 Aymara
 Pirai
 Coumarou
 Pacou
 Pacoussine
 Tiger torch
 Snail
 Shark
 Line
 Mule
 toadfish
 Palika
 Croupia
 Ti-Djol
 Patagaï

Local cuisine 

Creole cuisine blends flavors of tropical products Amazonian many from the forest as cassava, awara the comou and game. But many dishes have their roots deep in Africa, Asia and Europe. What gives it that spicy and subtle flavor. On the local market, instead of obligatory passage, the Creole merchant advise and make taste their products. This ranges from couac, cassava flour, essential for the realization of fierce lawyer, which draws all its power from the cayenne pepper. The cassava, long reserved for the poor, becoming a sought-after commodity, it is used in the stuffed restaurants in the Kalawanng or sweetened either with coconut jam, or with grated coconut or guava paste. As for Kontès, which consume a starter or an aperitif, they accompany the famous Ti' Punch.

Drinks 
 Ti' Punch (little punch)
 Saint-Maurice Rum
 Roselle syrup of Roselle (plant)
 Planter
 punch various (coconut punch, comou punch, maracudja punch ...)
 Comou or Açaí juice

Input 

 Creole pudding
 Shrimp Marinades
 Cod fritters
 Stuffed crabs
 soup z'habitants (creole soup)
 Mangrove oysters (from Montsinéry)

Dishes (food) 

 Blaff of fish or chicken
 Awara broth
 Calou (smoked preparation meat and / or shrimp and pigtails to country basis spinach and Calous)
 Lawyer Fierce
 Kalawang (green mango salad)
 Guianan colombo (stew of meat and vegetables with curry: potato, green arricot, etc.)
 Fricassee of pig, chicken, beef...
 Lizard or iguana fricassee
 Giraumonade (mashed pumpkin)
 Gratin couac
 Gratin various (papaya, ti-concombe, dasheen etc.)
 Pig-tails Beans ("haricot rouj ké la tcho cochon" in creole)
 Pimentade (fish in tomato sauce)
 Fish sauce maracudja
 Yam puree
 Couac salad
 Creole steak
 Smoked Fish
 Smoked Chicken
 Pork ribs smoked
 Lenses with pig-tails (" lanty ké la tcho cochon" in creole)

Desserts, sweets, pastries 

 Angou (desserts)
 Coconut Jam,
 Sweet potato jam,
 Conserve (coconut tablet)
 Couac coconut (sweetened semolina)
 Creticus (candied coconut)
 Frozen sorrel
 Lotcho (sweet pulp coconut)
 Pistachio Nougat (black nougat)
 Ramiquin (pulled candy sugar)
 Barley Sugar
 Wang (sweet or savory powder)
 Zoa (semolina sugary cereal)
 Zorey Milat (fruit in syrup jam)
 Coconut sorbet
 French toast
 Sispa
 Banana salad
 Eggs with milk
 Lanmou chinwa (cake)
 American (cake)
 Bindingwel,
 Countess
 Dizé milé (donut)
 Dokonon (poached cake in foil)
 Cramanioc cake (pudding)
 Marzipan,
 Banana pulp (slipper)

See also 

 Couac
 Cassava
 Buccaneer

References

Guyane sur le cuisine à la française

French Guianan culture
 
South American cuisine
Latin American cuisine